Grace Isabel Gibson AO, (17 June 1905 – 10 July 1989), also known as Grace Atchison and Grace Parr  was an American Australian radio entrepreneur, executive  and producer.
She was best known for her long-running serials Dr. Paul and the local version of NBC hit Portia Faces Life.

Biography 
Gibson was born in El Paso, Texas, USA, in 1905 to Calvin Newton Gibson and Mexican Margaret Escobara (Schultz) and finished her schooling in California. She started her career in her native US working for the Radio Transcription Company of America, as a distributor of radio programs, when recruited by Alfred Bennett, general manager of Sydney radio station 2GB, who was visiting the United States. Together they set up American Radio Transcription Agencies (later Artransa Pty Ltd), which sold American recorded radio programs throughout Australia, and Gibson moved to Sydney, Australia in 1934.

Gibson was on a buying trip in the US in 1941 when Pearl Harbor was attacked, and as a result she was prevented from returning to Australia for several years. Whilst stranded she became manager of her former company, Radio Transcription Company of America.

She later set up her own company, Grace Gibson Radio Productions Pty Ltd, which became one of the biggest producers of radio drama with broadcast productions that would air in Australia, New Zealand, South Africa, Hong Kong and Canada.

Gibson continued to produce radio dramas from her Australian headquarters for the South African market until as late as 1971, long after television had replaced radio as the main place to hear drama in the home in most countries.  This was because South Africa was virtually the last place in the English-speaking world to introduce television.

Gibson was three times married, she retired in 1978 and was awarded the Medal of the Order of Australia (AO) in 1987 in recognition of her services to radio in Australia. She died in 1989 in Potts Point, aged 84.

References

External links
 Website for Grace Gibson Productions Online Retail Store
 Read more about Grace Gibson, and listen to an oral history interview done with her on the National Film and Sound Archive of Australia's website.
 For more information about women in early radio in Australia visit the National Film and Sound Archive's Women in Early Radio collection.
 Grace Gibson Productions at National Film and Sound Archive.
Moran, Albert ‘Some beginnings for Australian television’, Continuum: The Australian Journal of Media & Culture, 1991, Vol 4 No 2
 

1905 births
1989 deaths
Australian radio producers
American emigrants to Australia
American people of Mexican descent
20th-century Australian women
Recipients of the Medal of the Order of Australia
Women radio producers